Jeremy Marshall-King (born 2 December 1995) is a New Zealand professional rugby league footballer who plays as a  for the Dolphins in the NRL and New Zealand at international level.

He previously played for the Canterbury-Bankstown Bulldogs and Wests Tigers in the National Rugby League and represented the Māori All Stars.

Background
Marshall-King was born in Whakatane, New Zealand. He is of Māori descent. He moved to Sydney, New South Wales, Australia at a young age.

He played his junior rugby league for All Saints Toongabbie, before being signed by the Wests Tigers.

Marshall-King is the younger brother of New Zealand international Benji Marshall.

Playing career

Early career
In 2014 and 2015, Marshall-King played for the Wests Tigers' NYC team, before graduating to their Intrust Super Premiership NSW team in 2016.

2017
In round 26 of the 2017 NRL season, Marshall-King made his NRL debut for the Tigers against the New Zealand Warriors. He spent the majority of 2017 playing for the Tigers in the Intrust Super Premiership NSW competition, making 19 appearances in a side that finished last on the table. In November, he signed a 2-year contract with the Canterbury-Bankstown Bulldogs starting in 2018.

2018
In round 1 of the 2018 season, Marshall-King made his club debut for the Canterbury-Bankstown Bulldogs against the Melbourne Storm, coming off the bench at hooker in the Bulldogs' 18–36 loss at Perth Stadium. In round 3, he earned the starting spot at five-eighth.

2019
Marshall-King played 23 games for Canterbury in the 2019 NRL season as the club finished 12th on the table.

2020
Marshall-King made 20 appearances for Canterbury in the 2020 NRL season.  The club finished in 15th place on the table, only avoiding the Wooden Spoon by for and against.

2021
Marshall-King made a total of nine appearances for Canterbury in the 2021 NRL season as the club finished last and claimed their sixth Wooden Spoon.

2022
On 1 June, Marshall-King signed a two-year deal to join the newly admitted Dolphins (NRL) side ahead of the 2023 NRL season.

2023
In round 1 of the 2023 season, Marshall-King made his club debut for the Dolphins, starting at hooker in the Dolphins' 28–18 victory over the Sydney Roosters at Lang Park.

References

External links

Canterbury Bulldogs profile
Wests Tigers profile

1995 births
Living people
New Zealand rugby league players
New Zealand Māori rugby league players
New Zealand national rugby league team players
Canterbury-Bankstown Bulldogs players
Dolphins (NRL) players
Rugby league five-eighths
Rugby league halfbacks
Rugby league fullbacks
Rugby league hookers
Rugby league players from Whakatāne
Wests Tigers players
Wests Tigers NSW Cup players